Katerine is a surname or given name, and may refer to:

Given name 
 Katerine Avgoustakis (born 1983), winner of the 2005 Star Academy show in Belgium
 Katerine Moreno (born 1974), Bolivian swimmer
 Katerine Duska, Canadian-Greek singer and songwriter
 Katerine Savard (born 1993), Canadian competitive swimmer

Surname 
 Philippe Katerine (born 1968), French singer

Given names